Meelis Mälberg (born 26 April 1970 in Räpina) is an Estonian politician. He has been member of X and XII Riigikogu.

He is a member of Estonian Reform Party. Mälberg was the mayor of Räpina from 1998 until 2002 and the mayor of Otepää from 2008 until 2009. From 2015 until 2019, he was the president of the Estonian Orienteering Federation.

References

Living people
1970 births
Estonian Reform Party politicians
Members of the Riigikogu, 2011–2015
Members of the Riigikogu, 2015–2019
Mayors of places in Estonia
Estonian University of Life Sciences alumni
People from Räpina
Members of the Riigikogu, 2003–2007